The Regulatory Reform (Execution of Deeds and Documents) Order 2005 is a statutory instrument applicable in England and Wales which was issued by the Lord Chancellor and signed by Baroness Catherine Ashton, then a minister in the Department of Constitutional Affairs. It reformed the legislation governing the execution of deeds and documents in order to standardise the formal requirements for companies, corporations and individuals.

It made amendments to the Law of Property Act 1925, the Companies Act 1985 and the Law of Property (Miscellaneous Provisions) Act 1989.

Like other England and Wales Regulatory Reform Orders, it was made through the exercise of powers available under the Regulatory Reform Act 2001.

References

Law reform in the United Kingdom